The Handa Cup Senior Masters was a men's senior (over 50) professional golf tournament named after Haruhisa Handa, held at the Ohmurasaki Golf Club, Namegawa, Saitama, Japan. It was held just once, in November 2010, and was won by Masahiro Kuramoto who finished 4 strokes ahead of the field. The total prize fund was ¥120,000,000 (€1,050,000) with the winner receiving ¥21,600,000 (€188,960). The event was co-sanctioned by the European Senior Tour and the PGA of Japan. Although played in 2010, it was part of the 2011 European Senior Tour season. Kuramoto was not a member of the European Senior Tour at the time and, although he later joined, the prize money was not included in his official earnings for the 2011 season.

Winners

References

External links
Coverage on the European Senior Tour's official site
Coverage on the PGA of Japan official site

Former European Senior Tour events
Golf tournaments in Japan